1 A.M., 1am, One A.M. or variants, may refer to:

A time on the 12-hour clock

Film
 1am (film), 2017 Tamil-language horror film
 One A.M. (1916 film), a Charlie Chaplin film
 One A.M. (unfinished film), by Jean-Luc Godard

Music
1AM, a 2006 album by Taylor Deupree
 One A.M. (album), by Diverse, 2003
 "1AM" (song), by Taeyang, 2014
 "1AM", a song by The Subways from the 2005 album Young for Eternity
 "1AM", a song by YG from  the 2014 album My Krazy Life
 "1AM", a song by Meek Mill from the 2018 album Legends of the Summer

Other uses
 1 attometre, a very small distance

See also
 IAM (disambiguation)
 Lam (disambiguation)

Date and time disambiguation pages